Remote Visual Inspection or Remote Digital Video Inspection, also known as RVI or RDVI, is a form of visual inspection which uses visual aids including video technology to allow an inspector to look at objects and materials from a distance because the objects are inaccessible or are in dangerous environments. RVI is also a specialty branch of nondestructive testing (NDT).

Purposes
Technologies include, but not limited to, rigid or flexible borescopes, videoscopes, fiberscopes, push cameras, pan/tilt/zoom cameras and robotic crawlers. Remote are commonly used where distance, angle of view and limited lighting may impair direct visual examination or where access is limited by time, financial constraints or atmospheric hazards.

RVI/RDVI is commonly used as a predictive maintenance or regularly scheduled maintenance tool to assess the "health" and operability of fixed and portable assets.  RVI/RDVI enables greater inspection coverage, inspection repeatability and data comparison.

The "remote" portion of RVI/RDVI refers to the characterization of the operator not entering the inspection area due to physical size constraints or potential safety issues related to the inspection environment.

Applications
Typical applications for RVI include:
 Aircraft engines (turbofan, turbojet, turboshaft)
 Aircraft fuselage
 Turbines for power generation (steam and gas)
 Process piping (oil and gas, pharmaceutical, food preparation)
 Nuclear Power Stations - contaminated areas
 Any areas where it is to dangerous, small or costly to view directly

References

Nondestructive testing
Maintenance
Tests